Gatis Čakšs (born 13 June 1995 in Līvāni) is a Latvian athlete specialising in the javelin throw. He won the gold medal at the 2014 World Junior Championships.

His personal best in the event was 84.86 metres set in Ogre in 14.08.2020. He improved it to 87.57 m in Eisenstadt (AUT) on 9 June 2021.

International competitions

References

1995 births
Latvian male javelin throwers
Living people
People from Līvāni Municipality
Athletes (track and field) at the 2020 Summer Olympics
Olympic athletes of Latvia